Alexander George Gurney (15 March 1902 – 4 December 1955) was an Australian artist, caricaturist, and cartoonist born at Pasley House, Stoke, Devonport (now Stoke, Plymouth), England.

Family
The son of William George Gurney (1866-1903), and Alice Birdie Gurney (1872-), née Worbey, who had married in Portsmouth on 29 May 1901, Alexander George Gurney was born on 15 March 1902 at Pasley House, Stoke, Devonport (now Stoke, Plymouth), England.

His father and his mother (born in Hobart), along with Alex settled in Hobart, Tasmania. Soon after, the ship upon which his father, a steward in the merchant navy, was serving, went missing at sea (off the Canary Islands); and his father was presumed dead. On 2 July 1908 his mother (always known as Birdie, rather than Alice) married again, to James William Albert Hursey (1866–1946).

Gurney married Junee Grover (1909–1984) on 16 June 1928 at Christ Church, South Yarra. Junee was the daughter of the journalist Montague "Monty" MacGregor Grover (1870–1943), and Ada Grover (1877-1928), née Goldberg. Alex and Junee Gurney had four children: John (1929–2004), Jennifer Anne (1932–2004), Susan (1937–2003), and Margaret (1943–), the eminent Melbourne artist.

Education
Gurney was educated at Macquarie Street State School, where his prowess with a pencil soon became evident, regaling his classmates with caricatures of their faces perched atop incongruous bodies.

Leaving school at age 13, he found employment at an ironmonger's shop, followed by a couple of other jobs, before embarking on an electrical apprenticeship with the Tasmanian Hydro-Electric Commission, in the expectation of becoming an electrical engineer. This entailed taking night classes at Hobart Technical College, but it was not long before his attention was drawn to art classes conducted at the same institution by Lucien Dechaineux (1869–1957).

Artist
As well as significantly embellishing his wonderful graphic skills as an artist, his exceptional capacity for the observation of his fellow humans also allowed him to successfully perform as an impersonator of well known people; and, by 1918, he was submitting work to The Bulletin, Melbourne Punch and Smith's Weekly. In 1923, he was awarded first prize at the Kingborough Agricultural Show for "an original pencil drawing".

In 1926 he published a book of his caricatures of eminent Tasmanians, Tasmanians Today, the first book of its kind ever published in Tasmania. Also in 1926, he began working for newspapers, briefly in Melbourne for the Morning Post, then freelanced in Sydney until he landed a job with the Sunday Times, then for a Labor paper The World, followed by the Daily Guardian, The Sydney Mail, then to Adelaide with The News in 1931. Throughout his lifetime he was renowned for his generous habit of giving the originals of his caricatures, cartoons, and comic strips to anyone who asked.

Cartoons and comic strips
During this time he created several comic series; Stiffy and Mo (based on the radio comedy starring Nat Phillips and Roy Rene) for Beckett's Budget; and The Daggs for the Sunday Times.

In 1932, he created "Fred, the Football Fan" for the Adelaide Mail.

When he moved to the Melbourne Herald in 1933 (as cartoonist for their Sports pages), he started a series Ben Bowyang (based on the C J Dennis creation) for that paper. In 1934 he became their feature cartoonist.

By 1939, his fame was such that, not only was he endorsing Red Capstan, cork-tipped, "special mild" cigarettes, he was also supplying the advertisement's art-work as well.

Bluey and Curley

In 1939 he created the characters for which he became famous: Bluey and Curley. He applied for the copyright registration of "Bluey and Curley" on 16 October 1939; and his application was granted on 9 November 1939 (Australian Copyright No.6921). The strip, about a pair of soldiers, Bluey, the Great War veteran who had re-enlisted, and Curley, the new recruit to the A.I.F.

Bluey and Curley first appeared in the "Picture-News" magazine. It was transferred to The Sun News-Pictorial in 1940, from whence it was syndicated throughout Australia, New Zealand and Canada.

The strip was widely appreciated for the good-humoured way it depicted the Australian "diggers" and their "mateship", as well as for its realistic use of Australian idiom of the day. During the war, he was accredited as a war correspondent, and he visited army camps throughout Australia and New Guinea to ensure authenticity for his strip. While in New Guinea he contracted malaria and was incapacitated for some time.

Gurney was in England in June 1946, as part of an Australian Press Syndicate sent specifically to view the Victory Parade. As well as sending caricatures of various eminent people involved in that parade back to Australia for distribution through the press, he also used the opportunity to have Bluey and Curley attend the parade, and a number of his Bluey and Curley comic strips reflected that event. Gurney's visit to London, and his version of events, as seen through his Bluey and Curley comic strip, was also historically significant for another reason: it was the first time that a newspaper comic strip had ever been transmitted from England to Australia by radio.
 
The strip lost some of its appeal and readership when the pair returned to "civvy street". After Gurney's sudden death in 1955, the strip was continued by Norman Rice, and then by Les Dixon.

Associations
Gurney was a member of the Returned Sailors' Soldiers' and Airmens Imperial League of Australia (RSS&AILA), now known as The Returned and Services League of Australia (RSL), the Black and White Artists' Club, now known as The Australian Cartoonists' Association, and the Savage Club.

Death
Gurney died suddenly, of heart disease, on 4 December 1955. He had been ill for several months, and had collapsed in his motor car parked outside his residence at 7 Merton Avenue, Elwood.

His funeral service, conducted by Rev. Selwyn Ide, at St Stephen's Church of England, Gardenvale, on Tuesday, 6 December 1955, was attended by "more than 500 journalists, artists and friends".

His art

Copyright

Publications
Tasmanians Today: Caricatures and Cartoons Hobart 1926.
Stiffy and Mo: Cartoons, Darlington 1928.
How to Draw for "The Mail", Young People's Supplement, The (Adelaide) Mail, (Saturday, 8 April 1933), p.2.
Ben Bowyang Herald and Weekly Times 1938.
Sickness without Sorrow (illustrations to stories by 'GP') Robertson & Mullens, Melbourne 1947.
Life with Laughter (illustrations to stories by 'GP') Georgian House, Melbourne 1950.

Illustrator
 Dyer, B., This'll Slay you! by Bob Dyer; illustrations by Gurney, Bob Dyer, (Melbourne), 1943.

Footnotes

References

 Gurney, Margaret, My Dad: Alex Gurney 1902–1955, M. Gurney, (Black Rock), 2006.
 Gurney,  John & Dunstan, Keith, Gurney and Bluey and Curley: Alex Gurney and his Greatest Cartoons, Macmillan, (South Melbourne), 1986.
 Riley, Michael, "Alex Gurney — Cartoonist", Boyles Football Photos, (1 January 2015).
 Hetherington, J., "Bluey's Creator Was Hobart Student", The Mercury, (Saturday, 28 July 1951), p.4.
 Hetherington, J., "He's the Boss of Bluey and Curley", The Barrier Miner, (Thursday, 2 August 1951), p.4.
 Hetherington, J., "Now, Meet Their Maker", The Sunday Times Magazine, The (Perth) Sunday Times, (Sunday, 12 August 1951), p.4.
 Hetherington, J., "Collins Street Calling", The Age, (Tuesday, 6 December 1955), p.1.
 The Cartoonist Wields a Mighty Pen, The (Adelaide) Mail, (Saturday, 28 January 1933), p.13.
 Meet Alex Gurney — Creator of Bluey and Curley, The Sunday Times Magazine, The (Perth) Sunday Times, (Sunday, 17 August 1947), p.9.
 J.A., "Bluey and Curley" Creator in Perth, The Sunday Times Magazine, The (Perth) Sunday Times, (Sunday, 15 May 1949), p.15.
 Eidelson, M., "Bluey and Curley", Flood, Fire, and Fever: A History of Elwood, Prahran Mechanics' Institute Press, (Windsor), 2006. 
 Lindesay, Vane, "Alex Gurney: Creator of Bluey and Curley", The La Trobe Journal, No 82, (Spring 2008), pp.59–65. 
 Stanley, P, "Remembering the war in New Guinea, The real Bluey and Curley: Australian images and idioms in the island campaigns", Symposium Paper, Australia-Japan Research Project, 2000.
 Famous Strip Creator Dead, The Age, (Monday, 5 December), p.3.
 Death Notices: Gurney, Alexander George, The Age, (Tuesday, 6 December), p.14.
 Funeral Notices: Gurney, Alexander George, The Age, (Tuesday, 6 December), p.14.
 Panozzo, S., "Gurney, Alexander George (Alex) (1902–1955)", Australian Dictionary of Biography, (1996).
 McCarter, Jim, "Historic Drawing Board", p. 6 in McCarter, J., Australian Curiosities: The Rare, Strange and Interesting (Robertson & Mullens' National Handbook No.15), Robertson & Mullens Ltd, (Melbourne), 1934.
 Kendig, D., "Alex Gurney", The Funnies Paper, (November/December 2000), pp. 24–26.
 Gurney, Alex (1902–55), p. 334 in Wilde, H.W., Hooton, J.W. & Andrews, B.G., Oxford Companion to Australian Literature (Second Revised Edition), Oxford University Press, (Melbourne), 1994.

External links
 Alex Gurney - Cartoonist, Boyles Football Photos.

Australian cartoonists
Australian comic strip cartoonists
Australian comics artists
Australian caricaturists
1902 births
1955 deaths
People from Hobart
People from Victoria (Australia)
War correspondents of World War II
The Herald (Melbourne) people
British emigrants to Australia